Broad Street Presbyterian Church may refer to:
 Broad Street Presbyterian Church, Birmingham in England
 East Broad Street Presbyterian Church in Columbus, Ohio, United States
 Old Broad Street Presbyterian Church and Cemetery in Bridgeton, New Jersey, United States